Zin are mythical water spirits that inhabit rivers and lakes in West Africa. The spirits are part of the mythology of the Songhai and Zambian peoples.

References 

Water spirits
West African legendary creatures